Karai is a small town in Mukim Kota Lama Kanan, Kuala Kangsar District, Perak, Malaysia. The town is also called Enggor. The town grew due to the rubber industry.

One of the famous attractions is the historical Victoria Railway Bridge.

Kuala Kangsar District
Towns in Perak